The Vils is a river in Bavaria, Germany, it is a right tributary of the Danube.

The Vils is formed by the confluence of its two source rivers, the Kleine Vils and the Große Vils, in Gerzen. It flows east through a rural area with small towns, including Aham, Frontenhausen, Marklkofen, Reisbach, Eichendorf and Aldersbach. It flows into the Danube in Vilshofen.

See also
List of rivers of Bavaria

References

External links

Rivers of Bavaria
Dingolfing-Landau
Erding (district)
Landshut (district)
Passau (district)
Rivers of Germany